Roepkiella pusillus is a moth in the family Cossidae. It is found in western Java.

References

External links 
Natural History Museum Lepidoptera generic names catalog

Cossinae